Helicia pterygota is a plant in the family Proteaceae. The bark is brownish. The specific epithet pterygota is from the Greek meaning "winged", referring to the pedicel. H. pterygota is endemic to Borneo where it is confined to Mount Kinabalu in Sabah.

References

pterygota
Endemic flora of Borneo
Flora of Sabah
Plants described in 1955